Sinatra Sings Days of Wine and Roses, Moon River, and Other Academy Award Winners (or simply Academy Award Winners) is a 1964 album by Frank Sinatra, focusing on songs that won the Academy Award for Best Song. The orchestra is arranged and conducted by Nelson Riddle.

Reception

Stephen Thomas Erlewine writing for Allmusic.com gave the album a lukewarm review, describing it as a 'professional and stylish album' but saying that it 'only yields a handful of true gems'. Erlewine found neither Sinatra or Riddle at fault, but said that the record plays as 'a series of individual moments, not as a cohesive collection'. Erlewine praises "The Way You Look Tonight" as one of Sinatra's 'classic performances', and rates "Three Coins in the Fountain" and "All the Way" highly.

Track listing
"Days of Wine and Roses" (Henry Mancini, Johnny Mercer) - 2:16
"Moon River" (Mancini, Mercer) - 3:20
"The Way You Look Tonight" (Jerome Kern, Dorothy Fields) - 3:22
"Three Coins in the Fountain" (Sammy Cahn, Jule Styne) - 3:46
"In the Cool, Cool, Cool of the Evening" (Mercer, Hoagy Carmichael) - 1:51
"Secret Love" (Paul Francis Webster, Sammy Fain) - 3:54
"Swinging on a Star" (Johnny Burke, Jimmy Van Heusen) - 2:53
"It Might As Well Be Spring" (Richard Rodgers, Oscar Hammerstein II) - 3:26
"The Continental" (Herb Magidson, Con Conrad) - 3:14
"Love Is a Many-Splendored Thing" (Webster, Fain) - 3:22
"All the Way" (Cahn, Van Heusen) - 3:27

Personnel
Frank Sinatra - vocals
Nelson Riddle - arrangements, conductor

References

1964 albums
Albums arranged by Nelson Riddle
Albums conducted by Nelson Riddle
Albums produced by Sonny Burke
Frank Sinatra albums
Reprise Records albums